Caroline Irma Maria Nevejan (Tilburg, 1958) is Chief Science Officer with the City of Amsterdam and professor by special appointment of Designing Urban Experience at the University of Amsterdam.  She is responsible for research, science and knowledge development in Amsterdam. She is known as a Dutch internet pioneer.

Internet pioneer 
Nevejan trained as a social scientist in the 1970s and belongs to the first generation of internet users. As Politics and Culture programmer at Paradiso from 1988 to 1999, she organized events such as the Galactic Hacker Party and The Seropositive Ball.

In 1994 she founded the Society for Old and New Media (Maatschappij voor Oude en Nieuwe Media). She did this together with Marleen Stikker, who was then "mayor" of the Digital City (De Digitale Stad). In 1996 they moved to the Waag on the Nieuwmarkt at which time the name changed to Waag Society. The foundation was the focal point for innovation in Dutch communication practices.

To make the internet more accessible for everyone, the foundation designed an internet-enabled digital reading table ("Storytable"). The table won the Rotterdam Design Prize in 1997.

Metropolitan issues 
As Chief Science Officer of Amsterdam, Nevejan is responsible for research, science and knowledge development in that city. She sees policy as a continuous design process in which people must be involved. In her research program Designing Urban Experience, scientists, residents, artists, designers and civil servants work together on innovative approaches and methods for the Amsterdam Metropolitan Area.

One of her projects is City Rhythm, a collaboration between civil servants, scientists and students and six municipalities that study whether different rhythms in a city can be influenced by social cohesion in the neighborhood.

Publications (selected) 

Nevejan C., Badenoch A. (2014) , 1980–1995. In: Alberts G., Oldenziel R. (red.) Hacking Europe. History of Computing. Springer, London
 Nevejan C. (2007)

References

External links 

 Caroline Nevejan, bijzonder hoogleraar Designing Urban Experience
 City Rhythms
 Witnessing You
 Waag | Technology and Society
 Nevejan's personal website

1958 births
Living people
Academic staff of the University of Amsterdam
People from Tilburg
Dutch women scientists
20th-century Dutch scientists
21st-century Dutch scientists
20th-century Dutch women